Arnold Caussin, c. 1505 – c. 1558, was a Renaissance choirmaster, musician, and composer, who wrote a number of motets.

Education
He was a student in the University of Krakow (1526), registered as "Arnoldus Caussin de Ath ex Hanoniensi Comitatu, Iusquin [des Prés] magnus musicus discipulus". He was a pupil of Josquin des Prez.

References

Renaissance composers
People from Ath
1510 births
Year of death unknown
Male classical composers